Rhode Island College (RIC) is a public college in Providence, Rhode Island. The college was established in 1854 as the Rhode Island State Normal School, making it the second oldest institution of higher education in Rhode Island after Brown University. Located on a 180-acre campus, the college has a student body of 9,000: 7,518 undergraduates and 1,482 graduate students. RIC is a member of the NCAA and has 17 Division III teams.

History 

Rhode Island College was first established as the Rhode Island State Normal School by the Rhode Island General Assembly in 1854. Its creation can be attributed to the labors of Henry Barnard, the first state agent for education in Rhode Island who had established the Rhode Island Teachers Institute at Smithville Seminary in 1845, and his successor, Elisha Potter. The Rhode Island State Normal School was one of the nation's first normal schools (teacher preparatory schools), which grew out of the humanitarian groundswell of the mid-19th century spurred by educational missionaries like Horace Mann. The school attracted hard working young people who came chiefly from ordinary backgrounds.

Not yet thoroughly convinced of the school's value, the General Assembly curtailed its financial support in 1857 and the school was moved to Bristol where it lingered until 1865 before closing. However, in 1869, the newly appointed state commissioner of education, Thomas W. Bicknell, began a vigorous personal campaign to revive the school. His efforts were rewarded in 1871 when the General Assembly unanimously voted a $10,000 appropriation for the school's re-opening in Providence.

Renamed the Rhode Island Normal School, the institution settled into a period of steady growth punctuated by periodic moves to larger quarters. The general favor won by the school, after its first difficult years had passed, was confirmed in 1898 when it moved into a large building specially constructed for it on Providence's Capitol Hill near the State House.

In 1920, the Rhode Island Normal School was renamed Rhode Island College of Education by order of the General Assembly. The college now offered a four-year program which upon a student's completion would grant a Bachelor of Education degree. At this time the observation school, which dated back to the 1890s, was renamed the Henry Barnard School. The college's graduate program also originated in the early 1920s and the first master's degrees were conferred in 1924.

For the next three decades the college remained a teachers' college with a student body of four to six hundred men and women. Early in the 1950s that calm was shattered by intense debate that arose over the college's role in the state system of higher education and for a time serious doubt was cast on its continued existence. There were plans to merge the institution with Rhode Island's other four-year college, the University of Rhode Island. After careful consideration, the Board of Trustees of State Colleges decided to keep the college independent and strengthen it overall.

In 1958, the college was moved to its current campus in the Mount Pleasant section of Providence. In 1959, the Rhode Island Commission to Study Higher Education recommended the development of the institution into a general college which was approved by the General Assembly. Reflecting the broadening of purpose, the institution's name was changed to its current name Rhode Island College in 1959.

The East Campus includes the former grounds of the Rhode Island State Home and School for Dependent and Neglected Children, the first post-Civil War orphanage in the country. In recent years, many efforts have been undertaken by Rhode Island College and its benefactors to preserve the Yellow Cottage (or Cottage C), one of the original structures from the State Home.

Principals and presidents
The president is the chief executive officer; prior to 1920, the chief academic officer of the college was known as the principal. Jack R. Warner is the eleventh president, and 19th chief officer of Rhode Island College, starting his position in 2022.  On January 6, 2022, previous president Frank Sánchez announced that he would not seek a third term as president of the college; his term ended on June 30, 2022 and was replaced by Jack R. Warner.

Academics

Academic programs at Rhode Island College are divided into five colleges: the Faculty of Arts and Sciences, the Feinstein School of Education and Human Development, the School of Management, the School of Nursing, and the School of Social Work. These schools offer more than 90 undergraduate and 30 graduate programs for students. Rhode Island College is accredited by the New England Commission of Higher Education. Among the five colleges, individual departments have received additional accreditation from the following associations: Council on Social Work Education, National Association of Schools of Art and Design, National Association of Schools of Music, National Association of State Directors of Teacher Education and Certification, National Council for Accreditation of Teacher Education, and the Commission on Collegiate Nursing Education. Forbes magazine ranked the college 618th.

Student life

Enrollment is predominantly from Rhode Island, Massachusetts and Connecticut. 67% of students are female.

The school's newspaper, The Anchor, has been running since 1928 as an independent, student-run publication. Its radio station is 90.7 WXIN Rhode Island College Radio.

Student activities and clubs on campus are governed and funded by Student Community Government, Inc., a semi-autonomous organization financed by the college's student activity fee, consisting of an executive board, parliament, and several committees. Student Parliament consists of 34 student positions and a number of by-lawed positions. Those positions include seats taken by administrators, faculty, staff and alumni. All student representatives of Student Parliament represent a constituency whose concerns they are supposed to represent throughout the academic year.

The  James P. Adams Library is the main library. Students, faculty, staff, and the community have access to a wide variety of knowledge resources including electronic reference resources, e-books, databases, audiovisual materials, and special collections.  The library is also the academic, social, and intellectual center of the campus, hosting a variety of lectures, exhibits and performances to the benefit of the campus community.

RIC has six residence halls which house 1,194 undergraduate students. Penfield Hall, a new $30 million, energy efficient, LEED-certified residence hall opened in 2007. The  building expanded the institution's existing housing capacity by 44%.

The Unity Center is non-denominational with many religions, ethnic groups, and academic concentrations represented.

Greek life
Rhode Island College has recently seen an increase in Greek  life on campus. The Greek Council consists of two fraternities and three NPC sororities, as well as numerous multicultural organizations. Fraternities at Rhode Island College include Alpha Sigma Phi and Kappa Sigma. Sororities at Rhode Island College are Alpha Sigma Tau, Delta Phi Epsilon, Theta Phi Alpha, and Zeta Phi Beta.

Athletics
Rhode Island College teams participate as a member of the National Collegiate Athletic Association's Division III. The Anchormen are a member of the Little East Conference. Men's sports include baseball, basketball, cross country, golf, soccer, swimming & diving, tennis, track & field and wrestling; while women's sports include basketball, cross country, golf, gymnastics, lacrosse, soccer, softball, swimming & diving, tennis, track & field and volleyball. The Intercollegiate Athletic Arena, an 8,000 seat facility, is the home of the Rhode Island College Anchormen basketball teams.

Arts
The Rhode Island College Department of Music, Theatre, and Dance was established in 1972.

Theatre students in the program have been top competitors at the Region I Kennedy Center American College Theater Festival, either winning first, second or honorable distinction. Professional choreographers and celebrated filmmakers are often guests of the program.

In September 2020, The Recording Academy placed the Rhode Island College Concert Chorus on the Official Ballot for the 63rd Annual Grammy Awards for their virtual performance of "When I Think of You." The chorus earned their Grammy Award Considerations in two categories: Best Pop Duo or Group Performance and Best Music Video. This was the first Grammy Award Consideration for a music performance group at Rhode Island College in the school's history.
 On October 2, 2020, Rhode Island College President Dr. Frank Sánchez hosted an event at Sapinsley Hall for music producers Al Gomes (class of 1986) and Connie Watrous, along with Chorus Conductor and Professor of Music Teresa Coffman, to announce the Grammy Awards news live to the entire Rhode Island College community including administration, staff, students, and alumni.

Notable alumni 
Notable alumni of Rhode Island College in arts and media include Grammy, Tony, Emmy, and Oscar-winning actress, Viola Davis (Class of 1988); actor and playwright, Ron McLarty (Class of 1969); visual artist, Patricia Cronin (Class of 1986); Grammy-nominated composer, Peter Boyer (Class of 1991); Jefferson Award-winning music producer, Al Gomes (Class of 1986); figurative painter, Ann Gale (Class of 1988); and Family Guy producer Danny Smith (Class of 1981). Alumni in journalism and reporting include new anchor, Anaridis Rodriguez and sports anchor, Jim Rose

Alumni who have served as members of the Rhode Island House of Representatives include Maria Cimini (Class of 2002), Raymond Gallison (Class of 1974), Karen MacBeth, Mary Messier, Patricia Morgan, William O'Brien, Thomas Palangio, Harold Metts, David Bennett. Graduates in the Rhode Island State Senate include Maryellen Goodwin, Nicholas Kettle, Daniel Issa, J. Michael Lenihan, Roger Picard, Juan Pichardo, Leonidas Raptakis, James Sheehan, Adam Satchell, and Frank Lombardo. Other alumni in politics include Allan Fung (Class of 1992), Congressman James Langevin (D-RI-2, Class of 1990), 70th Lieutenant Governor of RI Sabina Matos (Class of 2001), and Robert J. Healey (Class of 1979).

Other notable graduates include 1995 US Women's Chess Champion, Sharon Ellen Burtman; mountaineer, educator, and suffragist, Annie Smith Peck; and pioneering African-American educator and chemist, Josephine Silone Yates (Class of 1879).

References

External links 
 Official website
 Official athletics website

 
Public universities and colleges in Rhode Island
Educational institutions established in 1854
Universities and colleges in Providence, Rhode Island
1854 establishments in Rhode Island